Ivan Panin (born July 22, 1987) is a Russian nordic combined skier. He has competed in the World Cup many times but ever reached podium. Panin is better in ski jumping than in cross country skiing.

External links

1987 births
Living people
Russian male Nordic combined skiers
Nordic combined skiers at the 2014 Winter Olympics
Olympic Nordic combined skiers of Russia
Universiade gold medalists for Russia
Universiade bronze medalists for Russia
Universiade medalists in nordic combined
Competitors at the 2011 Winter Universiade